The 1998 WAC Championship Game was a college football game played on Saturday, December 5, 1998, at Sam Boyd Stadium in Whitney, Nevada. This was the 3rd and last WAC Championship Game and determined the 1998 champion of the Western Athletic Conference. The game featured the Air Force Falcons, champions of the Mountain division, and the BYU Cougars, champions of the Pacific division. Air Force would win the game 20–13.

Teams

Air Force

BYU

Game summary

Statistics

References

Championship
WAC Championship Game
BYU Cougars football games
Air Force Falcons football games
December 1998 sports events in the United States
1998 in sports in Nevada